António Augusto Gomes de Sousa (born 28 April 1957) is a Portuguese former football central midfielder and manager.

During his career he played, among others, for Porto and Sporting, amassing Primeira Liga totals of 483 matches and 83 goals over 18 seasons. Subsequently, he worked as a manager for several clubs.

Earning nearly 30 caps for Portugal during the 80s, Sousa represented the nation at the 1986 World Cup and Euro 1984.

Club career
Born in São João da Madeira, Aveiro District, Sousa started professionally with local A.D. Sanjoanense at only 16, with his team in the second division. In 1975 he signed with S.C. Beira-Mar, scoring a career-best 15 goals in his third year as the Aveiro club returned to the Primeira Liga (three of his four seasons there were spent in the top level).

Sousa was then bought by FC Porto, where he remained an undisputed starter. He won the league championship and the cup several times, also scoring against Juventus F.C. in the 1984 European Cup Winners' Cup Final, lost 1–2 in Basel.

In summer 1984, Sousa and longtime Porto central midfield partner Jaime Pacheco signed with Sporting CP – as part of the deal that sent 17-year-old prodigy Paulo Futre in the opposite direction – with the pair returning after two seasons. He then proceeded to win the European Cup, the Intercontinental Cup and the UEFA Super Cup with the northern side, continuing to appear regularly (he also scored in the second leg of the Super Cup final).

Sousa retired in 1996 at 39, as player-coach of first club Sanjoanense. He then dedicated himself exclusively to coaching, working mainly with another former club as a player, Beira-Mar, where he remained for seven and a half years, with four consecutive top-flight seasons. In 1999, he led the latter to its biggest achievement, the Portuguese Cup, after defeating S.C. Campomaiorense 1–0.

International career
Sousa played 27 times with the Portugal national team from 1981 to 1989, being part of the squads at UEFA Euro 1984 – where he scored in the 1–1 group stage draw against Spain– and the 1986 FIFA World Cup.

|}

Personal life
Sousa's son, Ricardo, was also a professional footballer, also in midfield. The pair shared teams at Beira-Mar, in four different spells.

His nephew, José, played ten seasons in the Portuguese top division. His grandson Afonso was also involved in the sport.

Honours

Player
Porto
Primeira Divisão: 1987–88
Taça de Portugal: 1983–84, 1987–88
Supertaça Cândido de Oliveira: 1981, 1983, 1986
European Cup: 1986–87
European Super Cup: 1987
Intercontinental Cup: 1987

Manager
Beira-Mar
Taça de Portugal: 1998–99

References

External links

1957 births
Living people
People from São João da Madeira
Portuguese footballers
Association football midfielders
Primeira Liga players
Liga Portugal 2 players
Segunda Divisão players
A.D. Sanjoanense players
S.C. Beira-Mar players
FC Porto players
Sporting CP footballers
Gil Vicente F.C. players
A.D. Ovarense players
Portugal youth international footballers
Portugal under-21 international footballers
Portugal international footballers
UEFA Euro 1984 players
1986 FIFA World Cup players
Portuguese football managers
Primeira Liga managers
Liga Portugal 2 managers
S.C. Beira-Mar managers
Rio Ave F.C. managers
F.C. Penafiel managers
C.D. Trofense managers
Sportspeople from Aveiro District